The year 1804 in birding and ornithology.

Events
 Jean Hermann ( Johannis Hermann) published Observationes Zoologicae : quibus novae complures, aliaeque animalium species describuntur et illustrantur Argentorati : Amandum Koenig
 Pope Pius VII established Gabinetto di Zoologia dell'Università Pontificia a natural history museum in Rome.
 Georges-Louis Leclerc, Comte de Buffon's Histoire naturelle générale et particulière commenced in 1749,  completed, sixteen years after his death. It was translated into many European languages and in various forms as Suites à Buffon.  Nine of the volumes are devoted to birds.
 Frédéric Cuvier begins  Dictionnaire des Sciences naturelles, dans lequel on traite méthodiquement des differens Êtres de la Nature ...Par plusiers Professors du Muséum National d'Histoire Naturelle et des autres principales Écoles de Paris. Strasbourg  (Levrault)Paris (Le Normant) 1804, 1805–1806 suspended until 1816

Ornithologists

Births
 Hermann Schlegel (10 June 1804 – 17 January 1884)

References

Birding and ornithology by year
1804 in science